James Peebles may refer to:
Jim Peebles (born 1935), astrophysicist, cosmologist and Nobel laureate
Jim Peebles (American football) (1920–1997), American football player
Jim Peebles (rugby league) (1931–2013), Australian rugby league player
 James Peebles (Texas politician)
James Martin Peebles (1822–1922), American spiritualist and anti-vaccination activist